Jamaluddin Syed Mohammed (born 3 June 1983) is an Indian cricketer who plays for Assam as a specialist slow left arm orthodox bowler. He is one who can hit sixes in death overs.

Syed

External links
Syed Mohammed – Cricinfo profile
Syed Mohammed – CricketArchive profile

1983 births
Living people
Indian cricketers
Tamil Nadu cricketers
Royal Challengers Bangalore cricketers
Assam cricketers

ICL India XI cricketers
Chennai Superstars cricketers